Vu Duc Minh Dack (born 18 October 1982) is a French karateka. He won the silver medal in the men's kata event at the 2012 World Karate Championships held in Paris, France. He also won medals at the World Karate Championships in 2008 and in 2014. He also won medals at many editions of the European Karate Championships.

Career 

He won the silver medal in the men's kata event at the 2009 World Games held in Kaohsiung, Taiwan.

In 2015, he lost his bronze medal match in the men's individual kata event at the European Games held in Baku, Azerbaijan. In 2017, he lost his bronze medal match against Antonio Díaz in the individual kata event at the World Games held in Wrocław, Poland.

Achievements

References

External links 
 

Living people
1982 births
Place of birth missing (living people)
French people of Vietnamese descent
French male karateka
European Games competitors for France
Karateka at the 2015 European Games
Competitors at the 2009 World Games
Competitors at the 2017 World Games
World Games silver medalists
World Games medalists in karate